Mhasawad may refer to any of the following places in Maharashtra, India:

 Mhasawad, Jalgaon district
 Mhaswad Dam in Satara district
 Mhasawad, Nandurbar district, a village in Shahada taluka